The Hungarian campaign of 1527–1528 was launched by Ferdinand I, Archduke of Austria and King of Hungary and Bohemia against the Ottoman Turks. Following the Battle of Mohács, the Ottomans were forced to withdraw as events elsewhere in their now massive Empire required the Sultan's attention. Seizing upon their absence, Ferdinand I attempted to enforce his claim as King of Hungary. In 1527 he drove back the Ottoman vassal John Zápolya and captured Buda, Győr, Komárom, Esztergom, and Székesfehérvár by 1528. Meanwhile, the Ottoman Sultan, Suleiman the Magnificent, took no action at this stage despite the pleas of his vassal.

Aftermath 
For the Habsburgs, the victory here would be a very disappointing one. On 10 May 1529, Suleiman the Magnificent launched his own counter-attack negating all of Ferdinand's gains. Of greater disappointment was the fact that many of the recently captured forts surrendered without resistance, greatly speeding up the advance. As a result, Suleiman was able to reach and besiege Vienna.

Notes 

 
Conflicts in 1527
Conflicts in 1528
Military campaigns involving the Holy Roman Empire
Military campaigns involving the Ottoman Empire
Wars involving Croatia
1527 in the Habsburg monarchy
1528 in the Habsburg monarchy
16th century in Hungary
1527 in the Ottoman Empire
1528 in the Ottoman Empire
Ferdinand I, Holy Roman Emperor